Tarache terminimaculata, the curve-lined bird-dropping moth, is a species of moth in the family Noctuidae (owlet moths). The species was described by Augustus Radcliffe Grote in 1873. It is found in North America.

The MONA or Hodges number for Tarache terminimaculata is 9145.

References

Further reading
 Lafontaine, J. Donald & Schmidt, B. Christian (2010). "Annotated check list of the Noctuoidea (Insecta, Lepidoptera) of North America north of Mexico". ZooKeys. vol. 40, 1-239.
 Ross H. Arnett. (2000). American Insects: A Handbook of the Insects of America North of Mexico. CRC Press.

External links
Butterflies and Moths of North America
NCBI Taxonomy Browser, Tarache terminimaculata

Acontiinae
Moths described in 1873